Lerose is a small settlement in Owsley County, Kentucky, United States, in the "Kentucky Highlands" region. It has a cemetery and several hollows. The Lerose community was named after Lleaner Rose, who ran a local store. He was known by the locals as Lee Rose, thus giving the community its current name. "Lee" later had a grandson, Chester Clay Rose, who was killed in the attack on Pearl Harbor on December 7, 1941. His body is entombed in the remains of USS Arizona.

References

Unincorporated communities in Owsley County, Kentucky
Unincorporated communities in Kentucky